The 1984 Davis Cup (also known as the 1984 Davis Cup by NEC for sponsorship purposes) was the 73rd edition of the Davis Cup, the most important tournament between national teams in men's tennis. 62 teams would enter the competition, 16 in the World Group, 25 in the Europe Zone, 12 in the Eastern Zone, and 9 in the Americas Zone. Singapore and Senegal made their first appearances in the tournament.

Sweden defeated the United States in the final, held at the Scandinavium in Gothenburg, Sweden, on 16–18 December, to win their 2nd Davis Cup title.

World Group

Draw

Final
Sweden vs. United States

Relegation play-offs

Date: 28–30 September

Americas Zone

  are promoted to the World Group in 1985.

Eastern Zone

  are promoted to the World Group in 1985.

Europe Zone

Zone A

  are promoted to the World Group in 1985.

Zone B

  are promoted to the World Group in 1985.

References
General

Specific

External links
Davis Cup Official Website
Davis Cup at SVT's open archive (including the 1984 tournament) 

 
Davis Cups by year
Davis Cup
Davis Cup